Humanity Unleashed is a 1920 German silent drama film directed by Joseph Delmont and starring Eugen Klöpfer, Paul Hartmann and Carl de Vogt. The film portrays a violent leftist attempt to seize power. However, its location shooting in the streets of Berlin coincided with the rightist Kapp Putsch.

The film's sets were designed by the art director Willi Herrmann.

Cast
 Eugen Klöpfer as Karenow, Russian agitator
 Paul Hartmann as Michael Klarenbach, engineer & director of chemical factory
Gertrude (Trude) Hoffman as Rita, Clarenbach’s wife
 Carl de Vogt as Winterstein, former officer, Karenow’s supporter 
 Emil Lind as Leutenholz, editor of the “Red Torch” 
 Hermann Bachmann as Director Turenius, owner of ammunitions factory 
 Arthur Bergen as Franziskus Turenius, his son
 Marion Illing as Camilla, Winterstein’s mistress
Rosa Valleti as leader of the mob, prostitute
Georg John as Fritz Breese, worker
 Clementine Plessner as hostess at Karenow's residence
Wolfgang Heinz as Kulicke, worker
 Kurt Mikulski as Lehmann, worker
 Leo Koffler as second-hand dealer
 Hella Thornegg as 1. prostitute, part of mob
 Lydia Potokaja as 2. prostitute, part of mob
Maria Forescu as 3. prostitute, part of mob
Sylvia Torf as 4. prostitute, part of mob 
Alfred Fisher as foreigner
Emil Linzen as Christof Jessen

References

Bibliography
 Rogowski, Christian. The Many Faces of Weimar Cinema: Rediscovering Germany's Filmic Legacy. Camden House, 2010.

External links

1920 films
Films of the Weimar Republic
German silent feature films
Films directed by Joseph Delmont
German black-and-white films
1920 drama films
German drama films
Films shot in Berlin
Silent drama films
1920s German films